{{DISPLAYTITLE:C3H8O}}
The molecular formula C3H8O may refer to:

 Methoxyethane (Ethyl methyl ether), CH3-O-CH2-CH3, CAS number 
 Propanols
 Isopropyl alcohol (isopropanol, 2-propanol), CH3-CHOH-CH3, CAS number 
 1-Propanol (n-propanol, n-propyl alcohol), CH3-CH2-CH2OH, CAS number